Prasad Bidapa is a Bangalore based fashion stylist and choreographer for various fashion events and shows. He is known to be a fashion consultant, choreographer, image consultant and stylist.

Career

He is the pioneer in the Indian Fashion Industry since the last four decades. He is the iconic fashion guru of india. An ex-student of NID Ahmedabad, he is the creator of high-profile events like India Men’s Fashion Week, Colombo Fashion Week, Kingfisher Fashion Awards & Megamodel Hunt.
A textile expert himself, he has presented the Rajasthan Heritage Week since 2015. This is a project he developed for the Government of Rajasthan under hon. Cm Smt. Vasundhara Raje. This is considered to be one of the most successful Khadi & Handloom revival projects in the country. 
He is currently working with various departments to create similar handloom revival projects in other states. 
He also holds the Karnataka Fashion Week annually working with National & International designers to present the products of Karnataka in handloom cotton, wool, silk and khadi. 

. He appeared on the cover of India Today in January 1998 as one of India's most influential Style Entrepreneurs. The Prasad Bidapa Fashion Week Bangalore was held in February 2013 for the first time. Prasad Bidapa Associates organized and staged the Official Swimwear Fashion Week of Sri Lanka and Fashion week of Bangladesh for three years. Rajasthan Heritage Week has set a benchmark in the revival of Khadi and the traditional textiles of India for which he has become one of the most influential spokespersons. He is an avid environmentalist and works with many citizen groups active in protecting the city of Bengaluru. //ishtailista.wordpress.com/tag/rajasthan-heritage-week/ 
//timesofindia.indiatimes.com/city/jaipur/rajasthan-heritage-week-weaves-in-dreams-for-the-artisans/articleshow/61981906.cms
//www.bing.com/videos/search?q=prasad+bidapa&docid=608013124076847438&mid=D3096CEFF044B00C8B18D3096CEFF044B00C8B18&view=detail&FORM=VIRE

Family

Prasad Bidapa lives with his family at a farm in Yelahanka with ten dogs and two cats.

References

Living people
Businesspeople from Bangalore
People from Kodagu district
Fashion stylists
Indian choreographers
Kodava people
Year of birth missing (living people)